TAPL may refer to:
 ABCB9, a protein
 The AWK Programming Language, a 1988 book by Alfred V. Aho, Brian W. Kernighan, and Peter J. Weinberger
 Types and Programming Languages, a 2002 book by Benjamin C. Pierce